Ricky Andrew (born 2 December 1989) is a rugby union coach and former player. He played professionally at wing and Fullback for Ulster and Nottingham, was player/head coach for Spanish side CAU Rugby Valencia, and is currently a pathway coach with the Ulster academy.

A graduate of the Hughes Insurance Ulster Academy, he made his debut for Ulster in the 2011/12 season. Over the next three seasons he appeared in the Pro12 and Heineken Cup, before moving to Nottingham in the English Championship for the 2015-16 season. After that he spent some time playing and coaching for Rainey Old Boys in the All-Ireland League, before being appointed head coach at CAU Rugby Valencia in 2017. As of 2022 he is a pathway coach with the Ulster Rugby academy.

References 

1989 births
Living people
Ulster Rugby players
Rugby union fullbacks
Rugby union wings
Rugby union players from Ballymena